Leonardo Rocha may refer to:

Léo Rocha (born 1985), Brazilian footballer
Leonardo Rocha (footballer, born 1997), Portuguese footballer
Leonardo Rocha (actor), Brazilian actor